Anjan Bista (born 15 May 1998) is a Nepalese footballer who plays as a forward for Martyr's Memorial A-Division League team Church Boys United and the Nepal national football team. He made his first appearance for the Nepal national football team on 31 October 2014. He has also played numerous times under the Nepalese u-17 team, including at the 2014 AFC U-16 Championship.

International career

U-17 career
Bista has been a regular for the Nepalese junior Gurkhas. During the 2013 SAFF U-16 Championship semi-finals Bista scored in a 5–1 win over Bangladesh. During the 2014 AFC U-16 Championship qualification Bista scored in a 2–0 victory over Bahrain, ending a six-year-long winning drought for the Nepali u-17 side. In the next game Bista scored the equalizing goal as Nepal came from 2–0 down to tie Iraq 2–2. Playing in the 2014 AFC U-16 Championship Bista started as Nepal scored a late equalizer to tie the match 1–1 against defending champions Uzbekistan. Bista was excellent in the next game against Kuwait, it was his early pressure that forced an own goal in the third minute, as well as it was Bista who was fouled in the box for the captain Bimal Magar to score the winning penalty.

U-20 career
In preparation for the 2015 SAFF U-19 Championship and the 2016 AFC U-19 Championship qualification campaign, Bista played in several friendlies in which he scored a hat trick against a senior Nepal Army Club earning a 4–2 victory. On the second match of the 2015 SAFF U-19 Championship, Bista converted a crucial penalty kick against Bangladesh. To which, the match was won 2:1. In the same tournament, Bista also scored a brace against Afghanistan in the semi-finals to register a 3:2 victory for Nepal sending the team into the finals. Nepal went on to win the final defeating India on penalty kicks.

Senior career
Bista made his international debut for Nepal on 31 October 2014 coming on for Sandip Rai in the 61st minute in an eventual 3–0 loss against the Philippines.

On 6 March 2015, Bista was selected for the 2018 FIFA World Cup qualification (AFC) senior team (Nepal) 2-leg match against India. He was as one of the main player when Nepalese team won Bangabandhu Gold Cup in Bangladesh and gold medal in SAG Games. He scored 2 goals during the Gold winning run in the 2016 SAG Games - one against Bhutan and one against Maldives in the semi-final.

Anjan has since been a prominent member of the Nepal senior team. As a member of the 2022 World Cup qualifier team. He scored 2 goals in 2–0 against Chinese Taipei in the World cup 2022 Asian qualifiers in Taipei. sBista performed well against Australia earning praise from the commentator Andy Harper and Simon Hill from Fox Sports.

Club career
During the 12th edition of the Aaha Rara Gold cup, playing for the ANFA Academy Bista score the opening goal in the 17th minute to put his team 1–0 up against Nepal Police Club in Pokhara. However Ranjan Bista scored the equalizer in the 35th minute and the Police Club went on to win on a penalty shootout.

Nepal APF
Bista joined Nepal APF for the upcoming 2015 Nepal National League. He scored his first goal for the club in the second round in a 4–1 win over Morang XI. Anjan's brother Ranjan Bista scored two goals in the same match.

Marbella United FC, Spain 

On 28 March 2016, Bista scored the only goal to defeat Nijmegen Eendracht Combinatie U-19 Academy 1–0. Anjan Bista showed brilliant performance during a match against ASC 09 Dortmund.

Manang Marshyangdi 
In 2018, Anjan joined Manang Marshyangdi Club. In his first season, he scored five goals in the Pulsar Martyrs Memorial A Division League as the team won a record 8th league titles. He was member of the team that took part in the AFC Cup 2019 group stage.

In the 2019–20 Qatar Airways Memorial A Division League, Bista scored 6 goals in 8 appearances as the team finished third.

Church Boys United 
On December 28 2022, New comer Church Boys United announced the signing of Nepal international Anjan Bista through there official Facebook handle. 
Bista signed one-year deal with newcomers.

Mumbai Kenkre 
On 21 January 2023, it was announced that Bista was sent on loan for remaining matches to Indian I-League club Mumbai Kenkre, as Mumbai Kenkre FC was in verge of getting relegated.

Personal life
After the 2014 AFC U-16 Championship it was announced that Bista had plans to turn to singing. Soon after a video of Bista singing popular a Dashain song was released. "This is a new taste for [me]. I really enjoy singing." said Bista afterwards thanking Kaarlrekha productions.

Career statistics

Club

International goals
Scores and results list Nepal's goal tally first.

Individual
NSJF Sports Award 2016 Youth Player of the Year

References

External links
Anjan Bista debut for Nepal

1998 births
Living people
People from Hetauda
Nepalese footballers
Nepal international footballers
Association football forwards
Manang Marshyangdi Club players
Footballers at the 2018 Asian Games
Asian Games competitors for Nepal
South Asian Games gold medalists for Nepal
South Asian Games medalists in football